Following the defeat of Mauron during the Breton War of Succession, the Franco-Bretons, led by Bertrand Du Guesclin, took their revenge at the Battle of Montmuran on April 10, 1354.

The battle 

Along with many other Englishmen, the young Hugh Calveley served in Brittany, supporting Jean de Montfort's English-backed bid to become Duke of Brittany against the French-backed claimant, Charles de Blois, during the Breton War of Succession.

In 1354, Calveley was captain of the English-held fortress of Bécherel. He planned a raid on the castle of Montmuran on 10 April, to capture Arnoul d'Audrehem, Marshal of France, who was a guest of the lady of Tinteniac. Bertrand du Guesclin, in one of the early highlights of his career, anticipated the attack, posting archers as sentries. When the sentries raised the alarm at Calveley's approach, du Guesclin and d'Audrehem hurried to intercept. In the ensuing fight, Calveley was unhorsed by a knight named Enguerrand d'Hesdin, captured, and later ransomed.

See also 
 List of Hundred Years' War battles

1354 in England
1350s in France
Montmuran 1354
Montmuran
History of Ille-et-Vilaine
Montmuran
War of the Breton Succession